The 2017–18 Sri Lanka Champions League is the 33rd season of the Sri Lanka Champions League. The season started on 2 September 2017.

League table

References

External links
Soccerway

Sri Lanka Football Premier League seasons
Sri Lanka